Her Second Chance is a 1926 American silent drama film directed by Lambert Hillyer and starring Anna Q. Nilsson. It was produced by First National Pictures and distributed through Vitagraph Company of America.

Cast
Anna Q. Nilsson as Mrs. Constance Lee / Caroline Logan
Huntley Gordon as Judge Jeffries
Charles Murray as Bell
Sam De Grasse as Beachey
William J. Kelly as Gabriel
Mike Donlin as De Vries
Dale Fuller as Delia
Jed Prouty as Stable boy
Corliss Palmer as Nancy

Preservation
With no prints of Her Second Chance located in any film archives, it is a lost film.

References

External links

1926 films
1926 romantic drama films
American silent feature films
First National Pictures films
Films based on American novels
Films directed by Lambert Hillyer
Lost American films
Lost romantic drama films
American black-and-white films
American romantic drama films
1926 lost films
1920s American films
Silent romantic drama films
Silent American drama films